Pagtingin is a song by Filipino folk-pop band Ben&Ben, composed by lead vocalist Paolo Benjamin Guico. It was released alongside "Araw-Araw" on May 2, 2019. It was used for the film LSS (Last Song Syndrome) released in 2019 under Globe Studios.

Music video
The music video of the song was directed by Jorel Lising, with appearances from Gabbi Garcia and Khalil Ramos and was released on July 19, 2019. A sequel to the music video, Araw-Araw, was released two months later on September 28, 2019. It was revealed by the band that the guitar solo during the break, performed by lead guitarist Poch Baretto and vocalist-guitarist Miguel Benjamin Guico, was recorded as they were filming the music video.

The music video is considered the most viewed video on the band's YouTube channel with over 21 million views since its release.

Appearances in the media and covers
Gabbi Garcia and Khalil Ramos performed their rendition of the song in the Wish bus in September 2019.
Moira Dela Torre and Ben&Ben performed the song on ASAP Natin 'To on September 8, 2019.
Regine Velasquez-Alcasid performed her rendition of the song on her virtual benefit concert on April 22, 2020.
Ben&Ben themselves performed their metal rock rendition of the song on their BBTV episode in the band's YouTube channel on August 12, 2020.
On their virtual performance in the 33rd Awit Awards in August 2020, Gary Valenciano and Ben&Ben performed a mashup of "Pagtingin" and Valenciano's "Di Bale Na Lang".

Aftermath
A comment from the music video, posted some time after its upload on YouTube, would become the sole basis for the composition of their 2020 single "Lifetime."

Awards and nominations

References

2019 songs
Ben&Ben songs
Tagalog-language songs